There are 13 national parks in Gabon, all created in 2002 when President Omar Bongo established Gabon's National Agency for National Parks (ANPN). The national parks cover 10% of the country.

National parks

References

Gabon
 
National parks